Neomyopites adjacens is a species of tephritid or fruit flies in the genus Urophora of the family Tephritidae.

References

Tephritinae